The 2018 Duquesne Dukes football team represented Duquesne University in the 2018 NCAA Division I FCS football season. They were led by 14th-year head coach Jerry Schmitt and played their home games at Arthur J. Rooney Athletic Field. They played as a member of the Northeast Conference. They finished the season 9–4, 5–1 in NEC play to be NEC co-champions with Sacred Heart. Due to their head-to-head win over Sacred Heart, they received the NEC's automatic bid to the FCS Playoffs where they defeated Towson in the first round before losing in the second round to South Dakota State.

Previous season
The Dukes finished the 2017 season 7–4, 4–2 in NEC play to finish in a tie for second place.

Preseason

Award watch lists

NEC coaches poll
The NEC released their preseason coaches poll on July 24, 2018, with the Dukes predicted to finish in second place.

Preseason All-NEC team
The Dukes placed five players on the preseason all-NEC team.

Offense

AJ Hines – RB

Nehari Crawford – WR

Alex Conley – OL

Matt Fitzpatrick – OL

Defense

Jonathant Istache – DB

Schedule 

 Source: Schedule

Game summaries

at UMass

Lock Haven

Valparaiso

Dayton

at Hawaii

Bryant

Robert Morris

at Saint Francis (PA)

at Wagner

Sacred Heart

at Central Connecticut

FCS Playoffs

at Towson–First Round

at South Dakota State–Second Round

Ranking movements

References

Duquesne
Duquesne Dukes football seasons
Northeast Conference football champion seasons
Duquesne
Duquesne Dukes football